Haberlandia hollowayi is a moth in the family Cossidae. It is found in the Ivory Coast. The habitat consists of coastal forests and swamp forests.

The wingspan is about 17.5 mm. The forewings are deep colonial buff with buffy olive lines. The hindwings are ecru-olive with a reticulated buffy olive pattern.

Etymology
The species is named in honour of Dr Jeremy Holloway.

References

Natural History Museum Lepidoptera generic names catalog

Endemic fauna of Ivory Coast
Moths described in 2011
Metarbelinae
Taxa named by Ingo Lehmann